The following article presents a summary of the 1985 football (soccer) season in Brazil, which was the 84th season of competitive football in the country.

Campeonato Brasileiro Série A

Semifinals

|}

Final

Coritiba declared as the Campeonato Brasileiro champions.

Campeonato Brasileiro Série B

Tuna Luso declared as the Campeonato Brasileiro Série B champions.

Promotion
The competition champion, which is Tuna Luso, was promoted to the following year's first level.

State championship champions

Youth competition champions

Other competition champions

* The 1985 title was shared between Baré and Trem.

Brazilian clubs in international competitions

Brazil national team
The following table lists all the games played by the Brazil national football team in official competitions and friendly matches during 1985.

Women's football

Domestic competition champions

References

 Brazilian competitions at RSSSF
 1985 Brazil national team matches at RSSSF

 
Seasons in Brazilian football
Brazil